Rudolfo or Rodolfo Infante Jímenez (born 1963 in San Benito, Texas, U.S.) and Anna or Ana María Ruíz Villeda (born 1971 in San Luis Potosí, Mexico) are a Mexican-American serial killer pair, active during 1991, in Matamoros, Mexico. They killed 8 women motivated by sexual compulsion.

They lured their victims, young women, with servant job promises, then raping, robbing, and killing them. They were captured on October 21, 1991 and sentenced to 40 years in prison, the maximum possible conviction in Tamaulipas state at this time.

See also
List of serial killers by country

References

1963 births
1971 births
Criminal duos
Living people
Mexican people convicted of murder
Mexican rapists
Mexican serial killers
People convicted of murder by Mexico